Hugh O'Sheridan (died 1579) was an Irish prelate of the Roman Catholic Church who served as Bishop of Kilmore from 1560 to 1579.

He was appointed the Bishop of the Diocese of Kilmore by Pope Alexander VII on 7 February 1560.

Bishop O'Sheridan died in office in 1579.

Notes

References

 
 

Year of birth unknown
1579 deaths
Roman Catholic bishops of Kilmore
16th-century Roman Catholic bishops in Ireland